The Tanaru River is a river in the Rondônia state in western Brazil.

See also
List of rivers of Rondônia

References

Brazilian Ministry of Transport

Rivers of Rondônia